Guvanch Abylov (born 30 March 1988) is a Turkmen footballer playing for FC Ahal of the Ýokary Liga as a midfielder. He received his first national team cap against Indonesia on 23 June 2011.

Club career
In February 2015 he played his last match with FC Altyn Asyr; in the AFC Cup against Al-Saqr.

Since March 2015 he has played for FC Hazyna.

International career

International goals
Scores and results list Turkmenistan's goal tally first.

Honours

Club
Altyn Asyr
 Ýokary Liga (1): 2014

International
AFC Challenge Cup
Runners-up: 2012

External links

 Historic campaign pushes Turkmenistan to new level

References

1988 births
Living people
Turkmenistan footballers
Turkmenistan international footballers
FC Aşgabat players
FC Altyn Asyr players
FC Ahal players
Sportspeople from Ashgabat
Association football midfielders